NK Varteks is a Croatian professional football club based in the city of Varaždin, founded by supporters of NK Varaždin who were dissatisfied with the name change from NK Varteks to NK Varaždin, club's financial difficulties and failure to make salary payments, which caused players to jump to other teams.

Season by season overview

References

External links
Official website 

Sport in Varaždin
Association football clubs established in 2011
Football clubs in Croatia
Football clubs in Varaždin County
2011 establishments in Croatia
Fan-owned football clubs